

Events

Pre-1600
 624 – The Battle of Badr, the first major battle between the Muslims and Quraysh.
1567 – The Battle of Oosterweel, traditionally regarded as the start of the Eighty Years' War.
1591 – At the Battle of Tondibi in Mali, Moroccan forces of the Saadi dynasty, led by Judar Pasha, defeat the Songhai Empire, despite being outnumbered by at least five to one.

1601–1900
1639 – Harvard College is named after clergyman John Harvard.
1697 – Nojpetén, capital of the last independent Maya kingdom, falls to Spanish conquistadors, the final step in the Spanish conquest of Guatemala.
1741 – The Battle of Cartagena de Indias (part of the War of Jenkins' Ear) begins.
1781 – William Herschel discovers Uranus.
1809 – Gustav IV Adolf of Sweden is deposed in the Coup of 1809.
1811 – A French and Italian fleet is defeated by a British squadron off the island of Vis in the Adriatic during the Napoleonic Wars.
1826 – Pope Leo XII publishes the apostolic constitution Quo Graviora in which he renewed the prohibition on Catholics joining freemasonry.
1845 – Felix Mendelssohn's Violin Concerto receives its première performance in Leipzig with Ferdinand David as soloist.
1848 – The German revolutions of 1848–1849 begin in Vienna.
1862 – The Act Prohibiting the Return of Slaves is passed by the United States Congress, effectively annulling the Fugitive Slave Act of 1850 and setting the stage for the Emancipation Proclamation.
1884 – The Siege of Khartoum begins. It lasts until January 26, 1885.
1888 – The eruption of Ritter Island triggers tsunamis that kill up to 3,000 people on nearby islands. 
1900 – British forces occupy Bloemfontein, Orange Free State, during the Second Boer War.

1901–present
1920 – The Kapp Putsch briefly ousts the Weimar Republic government from Berlin.
1930 – The news of the discovery of Pluto is announced by Lowell Observatory.
1940 – The Winter War between Finland and the Soviet Union officially ends after the signing of the Moscow Peace Treaty.
1943 – The Holocaust: German forces liquidate the Jewish ghetto in Kraków.
1954 – The Battle of Điện Biên Phủ begins with an artillery barrage by Viet Minh forces under Võ Nguyên Giáp; Viet Minh victory led to the end of the First Indochina War and French withdrawal from Vietnam.
1957 – Cuban student revolutionaries storm the presidential palace in Havana in a failed attempt on the life of President Fulgencio Batista.
1969 – Apollo 9 returns safely to Earth after testing the Lunar Module.
1979 – The New Jewel Movement, headed by Maurice Bishop, ousts the Prime Minister of Grenada, Eric Gairy, in a coup d'état.
1988 – The Seikan Tunnel, the longest tunnel in the world with an undersea segment, opens between Aomori and Hakodate, Japan.
1992 – The  6.6 Erzincan earthquake strikes eastern Turkey with a maximum Mercalli intensity of VIII (Severe).
1993 – The 1993 Storm of the Century affects the eastern United States, dropping feet of snow in many areas.
1996 – The Dunblane massacre leads to the death of sixteen primary school children and one teacher in Dunblane, Scotland.
1997 – The Missionaries of Charity choose Sister Nirmala to succeed Mother Teresa as their leader.
2003 – An article in Nature identifies the Ciampate del Diavolo as 350,000-year-old hominid footprints.
2012 – The Sierre coach crash kills 28 people, including 22 children.
2013 – The 2013 papal conclave elects Pope Francis as the 266th Pope of the Catholic Church.
2016 – The Ankara bombing kills at least 37 people.
  2016   – Three gunmen attack two hotels in the Ivory Coast town of Grand-Bassam, killing at least 19 people.
2020 – President Donald Trump declares the COVID-19 pandemic to be a national emergency in the United States.
  2020   – Breonna Taylor is killed by police officers who were forcibly entering her home in Louisville, Kentucky; her death sparked extensive protests against racism and police brutality.

Births

Pre-1600
1372 – Louis I, Duke of Orléans (d. 1407)
1479 – Lazarus Spengler, German hymnwriter (d. 1534)
1560 – William Louis, Count of Nassau-Dillenburg, Dutch count (d. 1620)
1593 – Georges de La Tour, French painter (probable; d. 1652)
1599 – John Berchmans, Belgian Jesuit scholastic and saint (d. 1621)

1601–1900
1615 – Innocent XII, pope of the Catholic Church (d. 1700)
1683 – Johann Wilhelm Weinmann, German botanist (d. 1741)
1700 – Michel Blavet, French flute player and composer (d. 1768)
1719 – John Griffin, 4th Baron Howard de Walden, English field marshal and politician, Lord Lieutenant of Essex (d. 1797)
1720 – Charles Bonnet, Swiss historian and author (d. 1793)
1741 – Joseph II, Holy Roman Emperor (d. 1790)
1763 – Guillaume Brune, French general and diplomat (d. 1815)
1764 – Charles Grey, 2nd Earl Grey, English politician, Prime Minister of the United Kingdom (d. 1845)
1770 – Daniel Lambert, English animal breeder (d. 1809)
1781 – Karl Friedrich Schinkel, German painter and architect, designed the Konzerthaus Berlin (d. 1841)
1798 – Abigail Fillmore, American wife of Millard Fillmore, 14th First Lady of the United States (d. 1853)
1800 – Mustafa Reşid Pasha, Ottoman politician, 212th Grand Vizier of the Ottoman Empire (d. 1858)
1815 – James Curtis Hepburn, American physician, linguist, and missionary (d. 1911)
1825 – Hans Gude, Norwegian-German painter and academic (d. 1903)
1855 – Percival Lowell, American astronomer and mathematician (d. 1916)
1857 – B. H. Roberts, English-American historian and politician (d. 1933)
1860 – Hugo Wolf, Slovene-Austrian composer (d. 1903)
1862 – Paul Prosper Henrys, French general (d. 1943)
1864 – Alexej von Jawlensky, Russian-German painter (d. 1941)
1870 – William Glackens, American painter and illustrator (d. 1938)
1874 – Ellery Harding Clark, American jumper, coach, and lawyer (d. 1949)
1880 – Josef Gočár, Czech architect (d. 1945)
1883 – Enrico Toselli, Italian pianist and composer (d. 1926)
1884 – Hugh Walpole, New Zealand-English author and educator (d. 1941)
1886 – Home Run Baker, American baseball player and manager (d. 1963)
  1886   – Albert William Stevens, American captain and photographer (d. 1949)
1888 – Paul Morand, French author and diplomat (d. 1976)
1890 – Fritz Busch, German conductor and director (d. 1951)
1892 – Janet Flanner, American journalist and author (d. 1978)
1897 – Yeghishe Charents, Armenian poet and activist (d. 1937)
1898 – Henry Hathaway, American director and producer (d. 1985)
1899 – John Hasbrouck Van Vleck, American physicist and mathematician, Nobel Prize laureate (d. 1980)
  1899   – Pancho Vladigerov, Bulgarian pianist and composer (d. 1978)
1900 – Andrée Bosquet, Belgian painter (d. 1980)
  1900   – Giorgos Seferis, Greek poet and diplomat, Nobel Prize laureate (d. 1971)

1901–present
1902 – Hans Bellmer, German-French painter and sculptor (d. 1975)
1904 – Clifford Roach, Trinidadian cricketer and footballer (d. 1988)
1907 – Dorothy Tangney, Australian politician (d. 1985)
1908 – Walter Annenberg, American publisher, philanthropist, and diplomat, United States Ambassador to the United Kingdom (d. 2002)
  1908   – Myrtle Bachelder, American chemist and Women's Army Corps officer (d. 1997)
1910 – Sammy Kaye, American saxophonist, songwriter, and bandleader (d. 1987)
  1910   – Kemal Tahir, Turkish journalist and author (d. 1973)
1911 – José Ardévol, Cuban composer and conductor (d. 1981)
  1911   – L. Ron Hubbard, American author (d. 1986)
1913 – William J. Casey, American politician, 13th Director of Central Intelligence (d. 1987)
  1913   – Sergey Mikhalkov, Russian author and playwright (d. 2009)
1914 – W. O. Mitchell, Canadian author and playwright (d. 1998)
  1914   – Edward O'Hare, American lieutenant and pilot, Medal of Honor recipient (d. 1943)
1916 – Lindy Boggs, American educator and politician, 5th United States Ambassador to the Holy See (d. 2013)
  1916   – Jacque Fresco, American engineer and academic (d. 2017)
1920 – Ralph J. Roberts, American businessman, co-founded Comcast (d. 2015)
1921 – Al Jaffee, American cartoonist
1923 – Dimitrios Ioannidis, Greek general (d. 2010)
1925 – Roy Haynes, American drummer and composer
1926 – Carlos Roberto Reina, Honduran lawyer and politician, President of Honduras (d. 2003)
1929 – Zbigniew Messner, Polish economist and politician, 9th Prime Minister of the Republic of Poland (d. 2014)
1933 – Mahdi Elmandjra, Moroccan economist and sociologist (d. 2014)
  1933   – Gero von Wilpert, German author and academic (d. 2009)
1935 – David Nobbs, English author and screenwriter (d. 2015)
1938 – Robert Gammage, American captain and politician (d. 2012)
1939 – Neil Sedaka, American singer-songwriter and pianist
1941 – Donella Meadows, American environmentalist, author, and academic (d. 2001)
1942 – Dave Cutler, American computer scientist and engineer
  1942   – Mahmoud Darwish, Palestinian poet and author (d. 2008)
  1942   – Scatman John, American singer-songwriter (d. 1999)
1944 – Terence Burns, Baron Burns, English economist and academic
1945 – Anatoly Fomenko, Russian mathematician and academic
1946 – Yonatan Netanyahu, American-Israeli colonel (d. 1976)
1947 – Lesley Collier, English ballerina and educator
  1947   – Beat Richner, Swiss pediatrician and cellist (d. 2018)
  1947   – Lyn St. James, American race car driver
1949 – Ze'ev Bielski, Israeli politician
  1949   – Sian Elias, New Zealand lawyer and politician, 12th Chief Justice of New Zealand
1950 – Joe Bugner, Hungarian-British boxer and actor
  1950   – Bernard Julien, Trinidadian cricketer
  1950   – Charles Krauthammer, American physician, journalist, and author (d. 2018)
  1950   – William H. Macy, American actor, director, and screenwriter
1951 – Charo, Spanish-American singer, guitarist, and actress
1952 – Wolfgang Rihm, German composer and educator
  1952   – Tim Sebastian, English journalist and author
1953 – Andy Bean, American golfer
  1953   – Deborah Raffin, American actress (d. 2012)
  1953   – Michael Curry, 27th presiding bishop of the Episcopal Church
1954 – Valerie Amos, Baroness Amos, Guyanese-English politician and diplomat
  1954   – Robin Duke, Canadian actress and screenwriter
1955 – Bruno Conti, Italian footballer and manager
  1955   – Glenne Headly, American actress (d. 2017)
  1955   – Olga Rukavishnikova, Russian pentathlete
1956 – Dana Delany, American actress and producer
1957 – John Hoeven, American banker and politician, 31st Governor of North Dakota
  1957   – Moses Hogan, American composer and conductor (d. 2003)
1958 – Mágico González, Salvadoran footballer
  1958   – Rick Lazio, American lawyer and politician
  1958   – Caryl Phillips, Caribbean-English author and playwright
1959 – Dirk Wellham, Australian cricketer
1960 – Adam Clayton, English-Irish musician and songwriter
  1960   – Rupert Spira, English spiritual teacher and author
  1960   – Joe Ranft, American animator, screenwriter, and voice actor (d. 2005)
1963 – Vance Johnson, American football player
1964 – Will Clark, American baseball player
  1964   – Craig Dimond, Australian rugby league player
  1964   – Trevor Gillmeister Australian rugby league player and coach
1966 – Chico Science, Brazilian singer-songwriter (d. 1997)
1967 – Andrés Escobar, Colombian footballer (d. 1994)
  1967   – Pieter Vink, Dutch footballer and referee
1969 – Darren Fritz, Australian rugby league player
1970 – Tim Story, American director and producer
1971 – Annabeth Gish, American actress
  1971   – Allan Nielsen, Danish international footballer and manager
1972 – Common, American rapper and actor
  1972   – Trent Dilfer, American football player, coach, and analyst
1973 – Edgar Davids, Surinamese born Dutch international footballer and manager
  1973   – Bobby Jackson, American basketball player and coach
1974 – James Brinkley, Scottish cricketer
  1974   – Thomas Enqvist, Swedish tennis player and sportscaster
1975 – Mark Clattenburg, English football referee
1976 – Troy Hudson, American basketball player and rapper
  1976   – Danny Masterson, American actor and producer
1978 – Tom Danielson, American cyclist
  1978   – Kenny Watson, American football player
1979 – Johan Santana, Venezuelan baseball player
  1979   – Cédric Van Branteghem, Belgian sprinter
1980 – Caron Butler, American basketball player
  1980   – Brad Watts, Australian rugby league player
1981 – Olena Kot, Ukrainian Journalist 
1982 – Nicole Ohlde, American basketball player
1983 – Kaitlin Sandeno, American swimmer
1984 – Geeta Basra, Indian actress
1985 – Alcides Araújo Alves, Brazilian footballer
  1985   – Emile Hirsch, American actor
1986 – Neil Wagner, South African-New Zealand cricketer
1987 – Marco Andretti, American race car driver
  1987   – Andreas Beck, German footballer
1988 – Furdjel Narsingh, Dutch footballer
1989 – Holger Badstuber, German footballer
  1989   – Marko Marin, German footballer
  1989   – Robert Wickens, Canadian racing driver
1990 – Anicet Abel, Malagasy footballer
1991 – Daniel Greig, Australian speed skater
  1991   – Tristan Thompson, American basketball player
1994 – Gerard Deulofeu, Spanish footballer
1995 – Jang Su-jeong, South Korean tennis player
  1995   – Mikaela Shiffrin, American skier
1998 – Jay-Roy Grot, Dutch footballer
  1998   – Jack Harlow, American rapper, singer-songwriter and actor
2001 – Thomas Dearden, Australian rugby league player
2004 – Coco Gauff, American tennis player

Deaths

Pre-1600
1202 – Mieszko III the Old, king of Poland (b. c. 1121)
1271 – Henry of Almain, English knight (b. 1235)
1415 – Minye Kyawswa, Crown Prince of Ava (b. 1391)
1447 – Shah Rukh, Timurid ruler of Persia and Transoxania (b. 1377)
1573 – Michel de l'Hôpital, French politician (b. 1507)

1601–1900
1601 – Henry Cuffe, Politician (b. 1563)
1619 – Richard Burbage, English actor (b. 1567)
1711 – Nicolas Boileau-Despréaux, French poet and critic (b. 1636)
1719 – Johann Friedrich Böttger, German chemist and potter (b. 1682)
1800 – Nana Fadnavis, Indian minister and politician (b. 1742)
1808 – Christian VII of Denmark (b. 1749)
1823 – John Jervis, 1st Earl of St Vincent, English admiral and politician (b. 1735)
1833 – William Bradley, English lieutenant and cartographer (b. 1757)
1842 – Henry Shrapnel, English general (b. 1761)
1854 – Jean-Baptiste de Villèle, French politician, 6th Prime Minister of France (b. 1773)
1873 – David Swinson Maynard, American physician, lawyer, and businessman (b. 1808)
1879 – Adolf Anderssen, German mathematician and chess player (b. 1818)
1881 – Alexander II of Russia (b. 1818)
1884 – Leland Stanford Jr., American son of Leland Stanford (b. 1868)
1885 – Giorgio Mitrovich, Maltese politician (b. 1795)

1901–present
1901 – Benjamin Harrison, American general and politician, 23rd President of the United States (b. 1833)
1906 – Susan B. Anthony, American activist (b. 1820)
1912 – Eugène-Étienne Taché, Canadian engineer and architect, designed the Parliament Building (b. 1836)
1921 – Jenny Twitchell Kempton, American opera singer and educator (b. 1835)
1936 – Francis Bell, New Zealand lawyer and politician, 20th Prime Minister of New Zealand (b. 1851)
1938 – Clarence Darrow, American lawyer and author (b. 1857)
1943 – Stephen Vincent Benét, American poet, short story writer, and novelist (b. 1898)
1946 – Werner von Blomberg, German field marshal (b. 1878)
1951 – Ants "the Terrible" Kaljurand, Estonian anti-communist, freedom fighter and forest brother (b. 1917)
1953 – Johan Laidoner, Estonian general and statesman (b. 1884)
1962 – Anne Acheson, Irish sculptor (b. 1882)
1965 – Vittorio Jano, Italian engineer (b. 1891)
  1965   – Fan Noli, Albanian-American bishop and politician, 14th Prime Minister of Albania (b. 1882)
1971 – Rockwell Kent, American painter and illustrator (b. 1882)
1972 – Tony Ray-Jones, English photographer (b. 1941)
1975 – Ivo Andrić, Yugoslav novelist, poet, and short story writer, Nobel Prize laureate (b. 1892)
1976 – Ole Haugsrud, American sports executive (b. 1900)
1983 – Paul Citroen, German-Dutch illustrator and educator (b. 1896)
1990 – Bruno Bettelheim, Austrian-American psychologist and author (b. 1903)
1995 – Odette Hallowes, French nurse and spy (b. 1912)
1996 – Krzysztof Kieślowski, Polish director and screenwriter (b. 1941)
1998 – Judge Dread, English singer-songwriter (b. 1945)
  1998   – Hans von Ohain, German-American physicist and engineer (b. 1911)
1999 – Lee Falk, American cartoonist, director, and producer (b. 1911)
  1999   – Garson Kanin, American director and screenwriter (b. 1912)
2001 – John A. Alonzo, American actor and cinematographer (b. 1934)
  2001   – Encarnacion Alzona, Filipino historian and educator (b. 1895)
2002 – Hans-Georg Gadamer, German philosopher and scholar (b. 1900)
2004 – Franz König, Austrian cardinal (b. 1905)
2006 – Robert C. Baker, American businessman, invented the chicken nugget (b. 1921)
  2006   – Jimmy Johnstone, Scottish footballer (b. 1944)
  2006   – Maureen Stapleton, American actress (b. 1925)
  2006   – Peter Tomarken, American television personality, game show host (b. 1942)
2007 – Arnold Skaaland, American wrestler and manager (b. 1925)
2009 – Betsy Blair, American actress (b. 1923)
  2009   – Alan W. Livingston, American businessman (b. 1917)
2010 – Jean Ferrat, French singer-songwriter (b. 1930)
2011 – Rick Martin, Canadian-American ice hockey player (b. 1951)
2013 – Clive Burr, English drummer and songwriter (b. 1957)
2014 – Reubin Askew, American sergeant, lawyer, and politician, 37th Governor of Florida (b. 1928)
  2014   – Edward Haughey, Baron Ballyedmond, Irish businessman and politician (b. 1944)
  2014   – Ahmad Tejan Kabbah, Sierra Leonean economist, lawyer, and politician, 3rd President of Sierra Leone (b. 1932)
  2014   – Icchokas Meras, Lithuanian-Israeli author and screenwriter (b. 1934)
2015 – Al Rosen, American baseball player and manager (b. 1924)
2016 – Hilary Putnam, American philosopher, mathematician, and computer scientist (b. 1926)
2017 – Amy Krouse Rosenthal, American author  (b. 1965)
2018 – Emily Nasrallah, Lebanese writer and women's rights activist. (b. 1931)
2021 – Marvelous Marvin Hagler,  American professional boxer (b. 1954)
  2021   – Murray Walker, English motorsport commentator and journalist (b. 1923)
2022 – William Hurt, American actor (b. 1950)

Holidays and observances
Christian feast days:
Ansovinus
Gerald of Mayo
James Theodore Holly (Episcopal Church (USA))
Nicephorus
Roderick
March 13 (Eastern Orthodox liturgics)
Kasuga Matsuri (Kasuga Grand Shrine, Nara, Japan)
National Elephant Day (Thailand)
Africa Scout Day

References

External links

 BBC: On This Day
 
 Historical Events on March 13

Days of the year
March